Hibi or HIBI may refer to:

 Hibi (surname), Japanese surname
 
 Hibi Eden (born 1983), Indian politician
 Hypoxic-ischemic brain injury